Labour Party leadership elections were held in the following countries in 1963:

1963 Labour Party leadership election (UK)
1963 New Zealand Labour Party leadership election